Mehmandust (also Romanized as Mehmāndūst) is a village in Damankuh Rural District, in the Central District of Damghan County, Semnan Province, Iran. At the 2006 census, its population was 937, in 264 families.

References 

Populated places in Damghan County